The National Football Conference - Western Division or NFC West  is one of the four divisions of the National Football Conference (NFC) in the National Football League (NFL).  It currently has four members: the Arizona Cardinals, the Los Angeles Rams, the San Francisco 49ers, and the Seattle Seahawks.

The division was formed in 1967 as the National Football League Coastal Division, keeping with the theme of having all of the league's divisions starting with the letter "C." The division was so named because its teams were fairly close to the coasts of the United States, although they were on opposite coasts, making for long travel between division rivals. The NFL Coastal Division had four members: Atlanta Falcons, Baltimore Colts, Los Angeles Rams, and San Francisco 49ers. Los Angeles and San Francisco occupied the West Coast, while Baltimore maintained its dominance over the lesser teams that remained in the division. Atlanta was placed in the division instead of the expansion New Orleans Saints despite being farther east than five Eastern Conference teams (Cowboys, Cardinals, Saints, Browns and Steelers).

After the AFL–NFL merger in 1970, the division was renamed the NFC West. The Baltimore Colts moved to the AFC East and were replaced by the Saints, who came from the Eastern Conference (the Saints played in the Capitol Division in 1967 and '69, and the Century Division in 1968). In 1976, the newly formed Seattle Seahawks spent one season in this division (Seattle did not play the other four members of the division home-and-home in 1976, playing each of the other 13 NFC teams and the other expansion team of 1976, the Tampa Bay Buccaneers) before moving to the AFC West. Except for that one year, the division remained the same until 1995 with the addition of the new Carolina Panthers team.  The Rams moved to St. Louis before that same season, making the division geographically inaccurate.  Ten of the fifteen NFC teams were based west of Atlanta, and twelve of them were based west of Charlotte (all except the Redskins, Eagles and Giants).

The 2002 re-alignment changed the entire look of the NFC West. The Falcons, Panthers, and Saints moved into the NFC South; while the Cardinals moved in from the NFC East and the Seahawks returned from the AFC West. The Rams remained in the West, preserving the historical rivalry with the 49ers that has existed since 1950, and thus had been the only team in the division that was located east of the Rocky Mountains until 2015; despite this, the re-alignment made the NFC West have all of its teams based west of the Mississippi River. With the Rams' return to Los Angeles in 2016, the entire NFC West is now located west of the Rockies for the first time in its history; all teams except for the Cardinals are based in the Pacific Time Zone (since most of Arizona does not observe daylight saving time, the clocks are the same as Pacific Daylight Time from the second Sunday in March until the first Sunday of November, through at least 2027). The 2016 season marked the first time neither the 49ers nor Seahawks played a division game east of the Rocky Mountains.

The NFC West became the second division since the 2002 realignment (the NFC South was the first) to have each of its teams make a conference championship game appearance: Los Angeles (2018 and 2021), Arizona (2008 and 2015), San Francisco (2011, 2012, 2013, 2019 and 2021), and Seattle (2005, 2013, and 2014). Also since 2002, each team has won at least three division titles, one of only two divisions in the league to do so. All of its teams have appeared in a Super Bowl at least once since the 2002 realignment (the only other division accomplishing this being the NFC South):  Arizona (2008), Los Angeles Rams (2018, 2021), San Francisco (2012, 2019), and Seattle (2005, 2013, 2014). As of 2021, the NFC West is the only division in the NFC that has not seen at least one of its teams win a Super Bowl when entering that year's playoffs as a wild-card entry (the same historical fact holds true for both the AFC East and AFC South).

In 2010, the NFC West became the first division in NFL history to have a champion with a losing record, after the Seattle Seahawks won the division title with a record of 7–9. They were joined in this distinction in 2014 by the Carolina Panthers, who won the NFC South with a record of 7–8–1, 2020 by the Washington Football Team, who won the NFC East also with a record of 7–9, and 2022 by the  Tampa Bay Buccaneers, who won the NFC South with a record of 8−9.

Since the end of the 2020 NFL regular season, the 49ers lead the division with a record of 589–499–16  (137–166–1 since re-alignment) with five Super Bowl titles and an overall playoff record of 33–22. The Rams hold a record of 586–575–21 (130–173–1 since re-alignment) with five Super Bowl appearances and two wins to go with a 25–26 overall playoff record. The Cardinals hold a 135–167–2 record since joining the NFC West (566–770–41 overall) and a loss in Super Bowl XLIII, currently with a 7–9 playoff record, 5–4 as a member of the NFC West. The Seahawks hold a record of 179–124–1 since joining the NFC West (367–340–1 overall), with three Super Bowl appearances, winning Super Bowl XLVIII to go with a playoff record of 17–18; they are currently 14–13 in the playoffs as a member of the NFC West, having gone 3–5 while in the AFC West. Since re-alignment, the Seahawks have led the division in wins, division titles, and playoff appearances.

Division lineups

 Place cursor over year for division champ or Super Bowl team.
 

The Western Conference was divided into the Coastal and Central divisions. Atlanta moved in from the Eastern Conference. Also joining the Coastal Division were Baltimore, Los Angeles, and San Francisco.
The Coastal Division adopts current name after the AFL–NFL merger. Baltimore moved to the AFC East. New Orleans moved in from Capitol Division.
Seattle was enfranchised in 1976. Moved to the AFC West in 1977.
In 1995, Carolina is enfranchised and the Rams move to St. Louis, Missouri.
For the 2002 season, the league realigned to have eight four-team divisions. Seattle returns. Arizona joins from the East. Atlanta, Carolina, and New Orleans moved to the new NFC South.
Prior to the 2016 season, the Rams moved back to Los Angeles.

Division champions

Following 2001, the Atlanta Falcons, Carolina Panthers, and New Orleans Saints left the NFC West to join the newly-formed NFC South. The San Francisco 49ers and the St. Louis Rams were joined by the Arizona Cardinals (from the NFC East) and the Seattle Seahawks (from the AFC West) to create the new NFC West. The Rams returned to Los Angeles prior to the 2016 season. 

*A players' strike in 1982 reduced the regular season to nine games. Thus, the league used a special sixteen-team playoff tournament for that year only. Division standings were ignored, and Atlanta had the best record of the division teams.

Wild Card qualifiers

*A players' strike in 1982 reduced the regular season to nine games. Thus, the league used a special sixteen-team playoff tournament for that year only. Division standings were ignored.

Season results

Notes and Tiebreakers
 Los Angeles won the Coastal Division based on better point differential in head-to-head games (net 24 points) vs. Baltimore. The Rams and Colts played to a 24–24 tie in Baltimore in October before the Rams won 34–10 on the season's final Sunday at the Los Angeles Memorial Coliseum. The result would be the same under the modern tiebreaker, which relies first on head-to-head record (Los Angeles won the head-to-head series, 1–0–1).
 The Baltimore Colts won the NFL Championship, but lost to the AFL's New York Jets in Super Bowl III.
 Due to player strikes, the league shortened the 1982 season's games and realigned all the teams into conferences. The records for the division teams are based on what it would have looked like if they were still in the division.

Rivalries
49ers–Rams rivalry
49ers–Seahawks rivalry
Rams–Seahawks rivalry
Cardinals–Rams rivalry
Cardinals–Seahawks rivalry

Total playoff berths as members of the NFC Coastal/West
(1967–2022) 

1Numbers since re-alignment in parenthesis
2These numbers only reflect the Seahawks, Cardinals, Falcons, Saints, Colts, and Panthers' time as members of the NFC West.

References

National Football League divisions
Arizona Cardinals
Atlanta Falcons
Carolina Panthers
New Orleans Saints
Los Angeles Rams
San Francisco 49ers
Seattle Seahawks
Sports in the Western United States
1967 establishments in the United States